Abdullahil Amaan Azmi is a former Bangladeshi Army officer and the son of Ghulam Azam, the former Amir of Bangladesh Jamaat-e-Islami. He was a victim of Forced disappearance in Bangladesh.

Early life
Azmi completed his S.S.C. at the Agrami High School and H.S.C. at Dhaka Central College.

Career
He was commissioned in 1981 in East Bengal Regiment of Bangladesh Army from the 5th batch of Bangladesh Military Academy long course.

Amaan Azmi was awarded the Sword of Honour for coming first on officer training. He rose to the rank of Brigadier General. Azmi was summarily dismissed from the Bangladesh Army by the Bangladesh Awami League government without pension and without any explanation.  He had the rank of Brigadier General at the time of his dismissal. On 12 November 2012, Azmi testified as a defence witness in the trial of his father, Ghulam Azam, International Crimes Tribunal-1. He was the lone defence witness at the trial. He expressed dismay with the Bangladesh Nationalist Party for not speaking about the death of his father. He led the Janaza (prayer) at the funeral of his father at the Baitul Mukarram National Mosque.

In 2015, Azmi controversially challenged the number of Indian soldiers killed in the Bangladesh Liberation war following a Facebook post by Journalist Anjan Roy. He also questioned the number of Bangladeshi citizens killed in the Bangladesh genocide. There have been claims that the unit of “lakh” was mistranslated to a million increasing the claimed deaths tenfold. This triggered criticism from Bangladesh civil society members and media.

Disappearance
Azmi was detained by plainclothes officers of Bangladesh Police on 24 August 2016 from his home in Moghbazar, Dhaka, Bangladesh. Around the same time two other sons of opposition leaders were detained, Hummam Quader Chowdhury, son of Salauddin Quader Chowdhury, and Mir Ahmad Bin Quasem, son of Mir Quasem Ali. Azmi's father died in 2014 while in jail after being convicted for war crimes in the Bangladesh Liberation war. In March 2017, Hummam Quader Chowdhury was released, and he could not say who had detained him.

See also 
 Forced disappearance
 Forced disappearance in Bangladesh
 Mir Ahmad Bin Quasem
 Bangladesh Army

References

Living people
Bangladesh Army brigadiers
Enforced disappearances in Bangladesh
Year of birth missing (living people)